Omicron Aurigae, Latinized from ο Aurigae, is the Bayer designation for an astrometric binary star system in the northern constellation of Auriga. With an apparent visual magnitude of 5.47, it is faintly visible to the naked eye. The star is a member of the Ursa Major stream of co-moving stars.

A magnetic field has been detected and it is a source of X-ray emission with a luminosity of: log Lx = 29.1. It is spinning with a projected rotational velocity of 29 km/s and is radiating 95 times the Sun's luminosity from its photosphere at an effective temperature of 8,660 K.

References

External links
 The Electronic Sky
 University of Florida Astronomy Department
 HR 1971
 Image Omicron Aurigae

A-type main-sequence stars
Astrometric binaries
Ursa Major Moving Group

Auriga (constellation)
Aurigae, Omicron
Aurigae, 27
Durchmusterung objects
038104
027196
1971